The Danish Defence Maintenance Service (FVT) is the element of the Danish Defence responsible for maintenance and service for all equipment.

History
In 2019, it was decided that to join the three branches' maintenance services, in order to focus more effectively on the resource management. It was created with a 1:1 move of personnel, from the branch maintenance services.

FVT is split into three departments, FVT Land, Maritime and Air, each responsible for their own branch.

Referencer

External links
 Official website 
 Official Facebook

 
Joint military units and formations
Military units and formations established in 2020
2020 establishments in Denmark